CAMP responsive element binding protein 1, also known as CREB-1, is a protein that in humans is encoded by the CREB1 gene. This protein binds the cAMP response element, a DNA nucleotide sequence present in many viral and cellular promoters. The binding of CREB1 stimulates transcription.

This protein is a CREB transcription factor that is a member of the leucine zipper family of DNA-binding proteins. This protein binds as a homodimer to the cAMP-responsive element, an octameric palindrome. The protein is phosphorylated by several protein kinases, and induces transcription of genes in response to hormonal stimulation of the cAMP pathway. Alternate splicing of this gene results in two transcript variants encoding different isoforms.

See also 
CREB

Interactions 

CREB1 has been shown to interact with:
 CEBPB,
 CREB binding protein,
 FHL2,
 FHL3,
 FHL5.
 HTATIP,
 P53, and
 RPS6KA5.

References

Further reading

External links 
 
 

Transcription factors